The 2015–16 West Bank Premier League is the 13th season of the top-flight football league in Palestine. Shabab Al-Dhahiriya are the defending having won their second championship last season.

Teams
Ahli Al-Khaleel
Hilal Al-Quds
Markaz Balata
Markaz Shabab Al-Am'ari
Shabab Al-Dhahiriya
Shabab Al-Khadr
Shabab Al-Khalil
Shabab Alsamu
Shabab Dora
Silwan
Taraji Wadi Al-Nes
Thaqafi Tulkarm

League table

References

West Bank Premier League seasons
1
West